Bachelor Apartments is a 1921 American silent comedy film directed by Johnnie Walker. It was distributed by the Arrow Film Corporation.

Cast
 Georgia Hopkins as June Shelton
 Fred Howard as I.O. Underwood 
 George Dupree as Thomas Shelton
 Zadee Burbank as Mrs. Shelton 
 George Reynolds as 	Bert Morely
 Edward M. Favor as Howard Thorpe
 Eva Gordon as	Pearl Thorpe
 Ruby Davis as Suzette
 Edward Boulden as Harold Wright
 Joseph Donohue as 	An Expressman
 Bernard Nedell as Janitor

References

Bibliography
 Connelly, Robert B. The Silents: Silent Feature Films, 1910-36, Volume 40, Issue 2. December Press, 1998.

External links
 

1921 films
1921 comedy films
1920s English-language films
American silent feature films
Silent American comedy films
American black-and-white films
Arrow Film Corporation films
1920s American films